Emory Rains (May 4, 1800 – March 4, 1878) was a lawyer, judge and political leader in the Republic of Texas and thereafter in the State of Texas.  Rains was born in Warren County, Tennessee, and moved to Texas in 1817. Emory Rains held many public offices and his life was devoted to public service. Rains was a Member of Texas Republic Senate from the District of Shelby and Sabine (1837–1839); a delegate to the Texas state constitutional convention (1845); a member of the Texas state house of representatives (1847–1848, 1851–1854); a member of the Texas state senate (1859). In 1839, Rains was a prime supporter of the historic law creating a Homestead exemption in Texas. In 1861, he stood with Sam Houston in opposition to secession from the union. In 1866, Emory Rains rode a mule to Austin, Texas, for the purpose of getting a bill introduced to create Rains County, Texas. Emory Rains died on March 4, 1878, of an apparent stroke, and is buried in the City Cemetery in Emory, Texas.  Both Emory, Texas, and Rains County, Texas are named for him.

External links
The Author of the Texas Homestead Exemption Law by AE Wilkinson, Southwestern Historical Quarterly - concerning attribution of homestead law authorship in Republic of Texas
 Political biography
 Brief history of Rains County, Texas
 Another history of Rains County, Texas

1800 births
1878 deaths
Texas state senators
People from Warren County, Tennessee
Members of the Texas House of Representatives
Rains County, Texas
19th-century American politicians